The Encyclopédistes (also known in British English as Encyclopaedists, or in U.S. English as Encyclopedists) were members of the , a French writers' society, who contributed to the development of the Encyclopédie from June 1751 to December 1765 under the editors Denis Diderot and Jean le Rond d'Alembert.

History
The composition of the 17 volumes of text and 11 volumes of plates of the Encyclopédie was the work of over 150 authors belonging, in large part, to the intellectual group known as the philosophes. They promoted the advancement of science and secular thought and supported tolerance, rationality, and open-mindedness of the Enlightenment.

More than a hundred encyclopédistes have been identified. They were not a unified group, neither in ideology nor social class. Below some of the contributors are listed in alphabetical order, by the number of articles that they wrote, and by the identifying "signature" by which their contributions were identified in the Encyclopédie.

Beyond the known collaborators – at least in name – many articles are not signed and certain authors expressed a desire to remain anonymous.  Other authors, Allard or Dubuisson  for example, remain a mystery to us. Moreover, the sporadic research into the quotations, borrowings, and plagiarisms in the Encyclopédie – the illustrations as well as the text – illuminate a group of "indirect" collaborators.

A machine-generated and incomplete list of authors sorted by number of posts can be found at the project ARTFL. There are lists by frequency and by letter.

Contributors

Denis Diderot
Diderot had just finished the translation of A Medicinal Dictionary by Robert James when the publicist André le Breton charged him, on 16 October 1747, to resume the project of translating the English Cyclopaedia that Jean Paul de Gua de Malves could not successfully complete. Diderot undertook the history of ancient philosophy, wrote the Prospectus and the System of Human Knowledge, and, with D'Alembert, revised all the articles.

Le chevalier de Jaucourt
Louis de Jaucourt is little known in other respects but was one of the principal authors in the disciplines of economics, literature, medicine, and politics.

D'Alembert
Jean le Rond d'Alembert is the author of the Preliminary Discourse and of several articles.  In 1752 d'Alembert, who was tired of the mocking, cries of indignation, and religious persecution against the Encyclopédie, retired from the encyclopedic undertaking.  Subsequently, his contributions were limited to the subject of mathematics, a sensible topic in the eyes of censors.

Alphabetical

Antoine-Joseph Dezallier d'Argenville
Antoine-Gaspard Boucher d'Argis
Arnulphe d'Aumont
Jacques-Nicolas Bellin
Jacques-François Blondel
Claude Bourgelat
Jean-François-Henri Collot
Étienne Noël Damilaville
Louis-Jean-Marie Daubenton
Denis Diderot
César Chesneau Du Marsais
Marc-Antoine Eidous
Jean-Baptiste de La Chapelle
Guillaume Le Blond
André le Breton
Georges-Louis Le Sage
Antoine Louis
Baron d'Holbach
Louis de Jaucourt
Edmé-François Mallet
Paul-Jacques Malouin
Jean-François Marmontel
Charles de Secondat, Baron de Montesquieu
Adrien Quiret de Margency
Jean-Baptiste-Pierre le Romain
Jean-Jacques Rousseau
António Nunes Ribeiro Sanches
Pierre Tarin
François-Vincent Toussaint
Anne Robert Jacques Turgot, Baron de Laune
Urbain de Vandenesse
Gabriel François Venel
Suzanne Verdier
Voltaire
Claude Yvon

Number of articles

37,870 – XXX (unsigned or undetermined)
17,288 – Louis de Jaucourt
5,394 – Denis Diderot
4,268 – Boucher d'Argis
1,925 – Edmé-François Mallet
1,309 – Jean Le Rond d'Alembert
994 – Jacques-Nicolas Bellin
720 – Guillaume Le Blond
707 – Gabriel François Venel
693 – Louis-Jean-Marie Daubenton
541 – Antoine-Joseph Dezallier d'Argenville
482 – Jacques-François Blondel
449 – Antoine Louis
428 – Marc-Antoine Eidous
414 – Baron d'Holbach
388 – François-Vincent Toussaint
344 – Jean-Jacques Rousseau
337 – Pierre Tarin
227 – Claude Bourgelat
214 – Jean-Baptiste de La Chapelle
199 – Urbain de Vandenesse
192 – Arnulphe d'Aumont
129 – César Chesneau Du Marsais
119 – Cahusac
108 – Le Roy
107 – Landois
91 – Beauzée
78 – Paul-Jacques Malouin
70 – Jean-Baptiste-Pierre le Romain
61 – Louis-Jacques Goussier, also supervisor of the engraved plates
56 – Malouin
45 – Lenglet Du Fresnoy
41 – Daubenton|Diderot
39 – Claude Yvon
39 – Daubenton|Vandenesse
32 – Boucher d'Argis
26 – de La Chapelle|d'Alembert
26 – Voltaire
25 – Diderot|Mallet
23 – Daubenton|Jaucourt
22 – Daubenton, le Subdelegue
21 – Barths
20 – Mallet|Diderot
20 – Formey
20 – Daubenton|Jaucourt
14 – Rousseau|d'Alembert
14 – Beauzee
13 – Watelet
13 – Boucher d'Argis
12 – Douchet et Beauzee
12 – Daubenton|d'Argenville
11 – Diderot|Vandenesse
10 – Jacques-François de Villiers
10 – Marmontel
10 – Forbonnais
9 – Papillon
9 – Mallet|d'Alembert
9 – Daubenton|Daubenton, le Subdelegue
8 – Faiguet
7 – d'Argenville|Diderot
7 – Tarin
7 – Pestr
7 – Jaucourt
7 – Bellin|Bellin
6 – Vandenesse|Diderot
6 – Toussaint|Mallet
6 – Durival
6 – Beauzee et Duchet
5 – d'Aubenton
5 – d'Alembert|Diderot
5 – Yvon|Diderot
5 – Venel|Venel
5 – Menuret
5 – Mallet|Mallet
5 – Diderot|Daubenton
5 – Daubenton|d'Argenville|Vandenesse
5 – Daubenton|Vandenesse|Diderot
5 – C. D. J.|Jaucourt
4 – d'Alembert|Mallet
4 – Romilly
4 – Rallier
4 – Louis|Diderot
4 – Blondel|Diderot

By letter

In the Encyclopédie, the authors are identified by a letter at the end of an article.

(A) – Boucher d'Argis
(a) – Lenglet Du Fresnoy
(B) – Cahusac
(b) – Venel
(C) – Pestré
(c) – Daubenton, le Subdélégué
(D) – Goussier
(d) – d'Aumont
(E) – de La Chapelle
(e) – Bourgelat
(F) – Dumarsais
(f) – de Villiers
(G) – Mallet
(g) – Barthès
(H) – Toussaint
(h) – Morellet
(I) – Daubenton
(K) – d'Argenville
(L) – Tarin
(M) – Malouin
(m) – Ménuret de Chambaud
(N) – Vandenesse
(O) – d'Alembert
(P) – Blondel
(Q) – Le Blond
(R) – Landois
(S) – Rousseau
(T) – Le Roy
(V) – Eidous
(X) – Yvon
(Y) – Louis
(Z) – Bellin
(*) – Diderot
(D.J.) – de Jaucourt
(—) – d'Holbach
(V.D.F.) – Forbonnais
(E.R.M.) – Douchet and Beauzée

See also
 Wikipedians

References

Age of Enlightenment
18th-century French writers
 
Encyclopedism